Eretmopus is a genus of moths in the family Geometridae erected by Turner in 1910.

Species
 Eretmopus discissa Walker 
 Eretmopus marinaria (Guenée, 1857)

References

Hemitheini